Jorge Betancourt García (born February 13, 1982 in Matanzas) is a male diver from Cuba. He represented his native country at two consecutive Summer Olympics, starting in 2004 (Athens, Greece). Betancourt twice (2003 and 2007) won a silver medal at the Pan American Games alongside Erick Fornaris in the Men's 3m Springboard Synchro event.

See also
 List of divers

References
 
 

1982 births
Living people
Cuban male divers
Olympic divers of Cuba
Divers at the 2004 Summer Olympics
Divers at the 2008 Summer Olympics
Pan American Games silver medalists for Cuba
Pan American Games medalists in diving
Divers at the 2003 Pan American Games
Divers at the 2007 Pan American Games
Universiade medalists in diving
Sportspeople from Matanzas
Universiade silver medalists for Cuba
Medalists at the 2005 Summer Universiade
Medalists at the 2003 Pan American Games
Medalists at the 2007 Pan American Games
21st-century Cuban people